Herbert Edward Francis (born January 11, 1924) is an American scholar, professor and writer.

Life and career 
Francis was born in Bristol, Rhode Island on January 11, 1924. He studied at the University of Wisconsin and earned a master's degree from Brown University

He is a professor emeritus of English at the University of Alabama in Huntsville. Francis has travelled three times as a Fulbright professor to Argentina. An author in his own right, he has published five collections of stories, some of which have been anthologized in the O. Henry, Best American, and Pushcart Prize volumes.

The University of Alabama in Huntsville has named its national short fiction prize in his honor.

Bibliography

Books 

The Itinerary of Beggars.  Iowa City, IA: University of Iowa Press, 1973. 
Naming Things: Stories.  Urbana, IL: University of Illinois Press, 1980. 
A Disturbance of Gulls and Other Stories.  New York: G. Braziller, 1983. 
The Sudden Trees and Other Stories.  Savannah, GA: Frederic C. Beil, 1999.
Goya, Are You With Me Now?.  Savannah, GA: Frederic C. Beil, 1999.
The Invisible Country.  Savannah, GA: Frederic C. Beil, 2003. 
I'll Never Leave You: Stories.  Kansas City, MO: BkMk Press, 2004.

Short non-fiction 
Animal World, by Antonio di Benedetto. Translated from Spanish by H. E. Francis, with an Afterword by Jorge García-Gómez.  Grand Terrace, CA: Xenos Books.  (Cover art by Peter Zokosky.)
The Arrival of the Autumn in Constantinople, by :es:Norberto Luis Romero. Translated from Spanish by H. E. Francis.  Green Integer, CA: Book 176 , 2010.
Last Night of Carnival and Other Stories, by :es:Norberto Luis Romero. Translated from Spanish by H. E. Francis.   Leaping Dog Press, 2004. (Cover photograph by Philip Coblentz.)

References
 

1924 births
Living people
American short story writers
Brown University alumni
University of Alabama in Huntsville faculty